Rugby union in Mayotte is a minor but growing sport.

Governing body 
The governing body is the French Rugby Federation, which has a regional section called the Ligue Regionale de Rugby de Mayotte.

History
Rugby was introduced to Mayotte by the French who colonised the area.  Isolated in rugby terms, Mayotte competes in the Africa Cup. More talented players tend to leave for Metropolitan France.

There are also strong links with rugby union in Madagascar, where it is a reasonably popular sport.

The most successful club in Mayotte is RC Mamoudzou, which has won every national championship from 2000–2009. In 2009, the result of the championship final between Mamoudzou and RC Petite Terre was 27–7.

See also 
 Mayotte national rugby union team 
 Confederation of African Rugby
 Africa Cup
 Rugby union in France

External links
 "Islam and Rugby" on the Rugby Readers review
 Archives du Rugby: Mayotte

References